Malikaiah V Guttedar (born 13 May 1956) is an Indian member of the Karnataka Legislative Assembly, representing the town of Afzalpur in the district of Gulbarga. Former minister of the Government of Karnataka and senior leader from Kalaburagi district, he was a member of the Indian National Congress party, and later joined BJP in 2018. He lost against  M. Y. Patil in the 2018 Karnataka Legislative Elections.

References 

1956 births
Living people
Place of birth missing (living people)
Karnataka MLAs 2013–2018
Indian National Congress politicians from Karnataka
People from Kalaburagi district
Bharatiya Janata Party politicians from Karnataka